The Angela Test is a 2005 album by Icelandic indie rock band Leaves. The Angela Test charted in the top 15 in weeks 33-35 in the Icelandic Topplistinn chart. In week 33 the album charted 9th, in week 34 it charted 12th and in week 35 it charted 6th.

Track listing

Reception

Adam Moerder of Pitchfork said The Angela Test sounded similarly to the sound of Coldplay while Chris Saunders of musicOMH said the album was likable from the core.

References 

2005 albums
Leaves (Icelandic band) albums
Universal Records albums